George Morton (25 April 1828 – 21 June 1861) was an English first-class cricketer.

Morton was born at Bedale in April 1828. Having played club cricket for a number of sides in the North of England, Morton made his debut in first-class cricket for the North in the North v South fixture of 1853 at The Oval, with him also appearing for an All-England Eleven in the same season against a combined Kent and Sussex cricket team at Tunbridge Wells. The following year he played for the North in the North v South fixture of 1854, before appearing in the same fixture in 1856. Morton scored 19 runs in his four first-class matches, while in hs role as a wicket-keeper he took 8 catches and made 4 stumpings. He died at Bedale in June 1861.

References

External links

1828 births
1861 deaths
People from Bedale
English cricketers
North v South cricketers
All-England Eleven cricketers